The Chanticleer Gift Shop is a historic house located at 103 West 3rd Street in Thibodaux, Louisiana.

Built in c.1900, the structure is a single story frame residence in Queen Anne Revival style with Eastlake gallery details.

The house was listed on the National Register of Historic Places on April 29, 1986.

It is one of 14 individually NRHP-listed properties in the "Thibodaux Multiple Resource Area", which also includes:
Bank of Lafourche Building
Breaux House
Building at 108 Green Street

Citizens Bank of Lafourche
Grand Theatre
Lamartina Building
McCulla House
Peltier House
Percy-Lobdell Building
Riviere Building
Riviere House
Robichaux House
St. Joseph Co-Cathedral and Rectory

See also
 National Register of Historic Places listings in Lafourche Parish, Louisiana

References

Houses on the National Register of Historic Places in Louisiana
Queen Anne architecture in Louisiana
Houses completed in 1900
Lafourche Parish, Louisiana
National Register of Historic Places in Lafourche Parish, Louisiana